Chatrapaul Singh (born 29 April 1954) is a Guyanese cricketer. He played in two first-class matches for Guyana in 1978/79.

See also
 List of Guyanese representative cricketers

References

External links
 

1954 births
Living people
Guyanese cricketers
Guyana cricketers